Pamela Kola was a Kenyan writer who is best known for her children's books about East African myths, legends, and fables.

Biography
Born in Kenya, Kola attended the University of Leeds, receiving a degree in Education. Kola ran a nursery in Nairobi. She collaborated with the East African Publishing House in the 1960s to produce a line of children's books.

Works
 East African How Stories (1966)
 East African Why Stories (1966)
 East African When Stories (1968)
 The Cunning Tortoise
 The Wise Little Girl

References

Kenyan women children's writers
Swahili-language writers
Kenyan women writers
20th-century Kenyan women writers
Year of birth missing (living people)